Kanvili is a community in Tamale Metropolitan District in the Northern Region of Ghana. It has a nucleated settlement located along the Tamale-Bolgatanga trunk road. It is a populated community.

See also
Jisonaayili

References 

Communities in Ghana
Suburbs of Tamale, Ghana